Christopher Andy "Burley" Bayer (December 19, 1875 – May 30, 1933) was an American Major League Baseball shortstop for the 1899 Louisville Colonels.

External links

SABR biography

1875 births
1933 deaths
19th-century baseball players
Major League Baseball shortstops
Louisville Colonels players
Atlanta Colts players
Peoria Distillers players
Terre Haute Hottentots players
Baseball players from Louisville, Kentucky